Abdur Rashid (born 1 October 1987) is a Bangladeshi cricketer. He made his Twenty20 debut for Uttara Sporting Club in the 2018–19 Dhaka Premier Division Twenty20 Cricket League on 26 February 2019. He made his List A debut for Uttara Sporting Club in the 2018–19 Dhaka Premier Division Cricket League on 8 March 2019. He was the leading wicket-taker for Uttara Sporting Club in the 2018–19 Dhaka Premier Division Cricket League tournament, with 16 dismissals in 10 matches.

References

External links
 

1987 births
Living people
Bangladeshi cricketers
Uttara Sporting Club cricketers
Place of birth missing (living people)